Vogar is a hamlet in the province of Manitoba, Canada.

Climate

References  

Hamlets in Manitoba